The 2005–06 Football League Championship (known as the Coca-Cola Championship for sponsorship reasons) was the second season of the league under its current title and fourteenth season under its current league division format.

Reading dominated the Championship, setting a new league record of 33 league games unbeaten between the opening day defeat by Plymouth Argyle and the loss at Luton Town in February; these were the only league defeats the team would suffer that season. On 25 March 2006 they clinched promotion to the top flight for the first time in their 135-year history thanks to a 1–1 draw away to Leicester City. Coppell's team secured the league title in the following week, with a 5–0 drubbing of Derby County, and they would go on to set a new English league record for the number of points won in a season, with 106.

Changes from last season

Team changes

From Championship
Promoted to Premier League
Sunderland
Wigan Athletic
West Ham United

Relegated to League One
Gillingham
Nottingham Forest
Rotherham United

To Championship
Promoted from League One
Luton Town
Hull City
Sheffield Wednesday

Relegated from Premier League
Crystal Palace
Norwich City
Southampton

Team overview

Stadia and locations

League table

Play-offs

Semi-finals

First leg

Second leg

Leeds United win 3–1 on aggregate.

Watford win 3–0 on aggregate.

Final

Results

References

 
EFL Championship seasons
1
Eng
2